Jacques Doucet was a French sailor who competed in the 1900 Summer Olympics.

He was the crew member of the French boat Favorite 1, which won two silver medals in the races of the 2 to 3 ton class. He also participated in the Open class, but did not finish the race.

Further reading

References

External links

French male sailors (sport)
Sailors at the 1900 Summer Olympics – 2 to 3 ton
Sailors at the 1900 Summer Olympics – Open class
Olympic sailors of France
Year of birth missing
Year of death missing
Olympic silver medalists for France
Place of birth missing
Place of death missing